This is a list of the Maldives women's national football team results from 2000 to the present day.

2000s

2004

2005

2007

2009

2010

2012

2013

2014

2015

2016

2017

2018

2019

2021

2022

Record

By competition

By venue

By opponent

References

External links 
 Maldives women's national football team results at FIFA.com

Resutls
2004 in Maldivian football
2005 in Maldivian football
2006 in Maldivian football
2007 in Maldivian football
2008 in Maldivian football
2009 in Maldivian football
2010 in Maldivian football
2011 in Maldivian football
2012 in Maldivian football
2013 in Maldivian football
2014 in Maldivian football
Maldives